Bruce David Barth (born September 7, 1958) is a jazz pianist, composer, and producer.

Early life
Barth was born in Pasadena, California, on September 7, 1958. He started to play the piano around the age of five. He had private jazz lessons with pianist Norman Simmons from 1978 to 1980 and studied at the New England Conservatory of Music in the early 1980s, including under Jaki Byard and George Russell.

Later life and career
Barth moved to New York in 1988, where he was part of groups led by Stanley Turrentine (1989–90) and Terence Blanchard (1990–94). Barth's first album as a leader, In Focus, was released by Enja Records and was based around standards. The follow-up, Morning Call, was also released by Enja and the material was mostly Barth originals. He has led his own small groups since 1993, and has been a freelance pianist and arranger. He was on the teaching faculty of the Berklee College of Music from 1985 to 1988 and Long Island University from 1990. He has also been a record producer, including for vocalist Carla Cook.

Discography
An asterisk (*) indicates that the year is that of release.

As leader

As sideman

References

American jazz pianists
American male pianists
Musicians from Pasadena, California
1958 births
Living people
20th-century American pianists
Jazz musicians from California
21st-century American pianists
20th-century American male musicians
21st-century American male musicians
American male jazz musicians
Enja Records artists
Double-Time Records artists